The Brave is a 1997 American independent neo-western film adapted from the Gregory Mcdonald novel of the same title. It was directed and co-written by Johnny Depp. The cast includes Depp and Marlon Brando.

This film was Depp's directorial debut. He co-wrote the screenplay with his brother. The film was first shown at the 1997 Cannes Film Festival where it received generally negative reviews. The film was released in theaters and on DVD internationally, but not in the United States.

Plot
A Native American man named Raphael lives with his wife and two children in a remote community, near a garbage dump. He sells whatever he can to make a living. Raphael, seeing the hopelessness of his situation and his inability to provide for his family, agrees to star in a snuff film for a large sum of money that he hopes will give his family a chance for a better life.

Having been given part of the money in advance, Raphael is given a week to live and then return to be tortured and killed in front of the camera. Over the course of his final week of his life Raphael changes his relationship with his wife and children and faces his own personal anguish with his fate.

Cast and characters

Production
The initial script, written by Paul McCudden and based on a book by Gregory Mcdonald, attracted interest from Hollywood studios in 1993, despite the dark nature of the story. Disney's Touchstone Pictures eventually picked up the film, and work on it was set to happen at the start of 1994. In December 1993 however, Aziz Ghazal (the first time director from USC film school who was attached to the picture) killed his wife and daughter before committing suicide. His body would not be found by Los Angeles police for over a month. With the director of the film missing and presumed responsible for the murder of his family, Touchstone immediately suspended production.

In spite of this major setback, McCudden and his production partner Charles Evans persisted in trying to get the film made, as they had already invested a substantial amount of their own money into it. In 1994, they were able to convince Johnny Depp to rewrite, direct and produce the film. Depp didn't like the original script, but still took on the project as he was moved by "the idea of sacrifice for family." Depp cast himself in the lead role as a means to attract interest from potential financers. The film had an estimated production budget of $5 million and Depp agreed to pay if the cost went over, and may have put as much as $2 million of his own money into the film.

Reception
The initial 1997 reviews from American critics were highly negative. On Rotten Tomatoes the film has an approval rating of 33% based on reviews from 6 critics. Variety dismissed the film as "a turgid and unbelievable neo-western." Time Out says there's nothing inherently wrong with the film but that "Besides the implausibilities, the direction has two fatal flaws: it's both tediously slow and hugely narcissistic as the camera focuses repeatedly on Depp's bandana'd head and rippling torso."

The negative reviews led to Depp's decision to not give The Brave a formal release in the United States, either in theaters or on home media.

References

External links
 

1997 films
1997 drama films
Films about Native Americans
Films directed by Johnny Depp
Films about snuff films
Films based on American novels
Neo-Western films
1997 directorial debut films
1990s English-language films